Steve Randall (also known as Hollywood Off-Beat) is an American detective television series starring Melvyn Douglas that ran on the DuMont Television Network from November 7, 1952, to January 30, 1953, and on CBS from June 16, 1953, to August 11, 1953.

Background and premise 
The series' concept originated from stories written by Louis Blatz, an attorney. The initial TV adaptation was A Hollywood Affair, starring Lee J. Cobb and Adele Jergens. The pilot for that series did not sell, but the producers tried the same concept again with Steve Randall.

Steve Randall is a disbarred attorney who became a private detective in an effort to be reinstated as a lawyer. He handled cases such as blackmail and murder before he was reinstated in the series's final episode.

Cast and production 
In addition to Douglas, the program featured Mary Beth Hughes.

Some episodes of the program were broadcast on local stations as Hollywood Off Beat before it began its network run. The episodes on DuMont were broadcast on Fridays from 8 to 8:30 p.m. Eastern Time. 

United Television Programs distributed the show. Marion Parsonnet was the producer and director. Sponsors included Swank men's jewelry and Dixie Cups.

Episode status
 
"The Trial" (September 11, 1952) is available for viewing on the Internet Archive. Four episodes (June 12, July 3, August 14, and September 11, 1952) are in the J. Fred MacDonald collection at the Library of Congress.

Critical response
Critic Jack Gould wrote in The New York Times in 1953 that a repeat of an episode was "just as familiar and just as tired" as it had been previously, with "the usual quota of murders, an oomphy siren and tough guys talking out of the side of the mouth."

A capsule review in the trade publication Billboard said that Douglas "is adept at lending importance where little or none is due." As a result, it added, the series "often rises above its material."

Syndicated critic John Crosby wrote, "As adventure whodunits go, this is a pretty good one."

See also
 List of programs broadcast by the DuMont Television Network
 List of surviving DuMont Television Network broadcasts

References

Bibliography
 David Weinstein, The Forgotten Network: DuMont and the Birth of American Television (Philadelphia: Temple University Press, 2004)

External links
 "The Trial" on the Internet Archive
 Steve Randall at IMDB
 DuMont historical website
 List of episodes at CTVA
 Steve Randall at ThrillingDetective

1952 American television series debuts
1953 American television series endings
Black-and-white American television shows
CBS original programming
DuMont Television Network original programming